Kelheim is a town and municipality in Bavaria, Germany. It is the capital of the district Kelheim and is situated at the confluence of the rivers Altmühl and Danube. Kelheim has a population of around 16,750 (2020).

History

Kelheim is the site of a large Iron Age oppidum from the La Tène period, which has been tentatively identified with the Celtic city of Alcimoennis mentioned by Ptolemy in his Geography. The ramparts of the fort cross the promontory between the rivers Altmühl and Danube. There is an inner defensive line enclosing 60 ha near the confluence, then a long outer rampart enclosing an enormous area of 630 ha. A small promontory fort on the other bank of the Danube has a series of short linear ramparts protecting a settlement in the bend of a meander. This is aligned with the end of the outer rampart on the far bank, dominating traffic on the river. Kelheim has given its name to the pfostenschlitzmauer style of rampart construction characterized by vertical wooden posts set into the stone facing.

Kelheim was first mentioned in the 9th century. At this time it was the seat of a count (Graf). According to tradition of Braunau in Rohr Abbey, Kelheim received borough rights in 1151. 

G. Schneider & Sohn has a large weissbier brewery in the city.

Culture and sights

 Hall of Liberation on the Michelsberg (built by Leo von Klenze)
 Danube Gorge and Weltenburg Abbey, Wipfelsfurt valley, and Klösterl (Trauntal monastery)
 Kelheim is the home of the G. Schneider & Sohn brewing company.

Born in Kelheim
 Otto I, Duke of Bavaria (c. 1117-1183), Duke of Bavaria
 Louis I, Duke of Bavaria (1173-1231), Duke of Bavaria
 Otto II, Duke of Bavaria (1206-1253), Duke of Bavaria
 Albert II, Duke of Bavaria (1368-1397), Governor in the Lower Bavaria part of the duchy of Bavaria
 Friedrich L. Bauer (1924-2015), pioneer of computer science
 Fritz Fischer (* 1956), a former biathlete
 Matthias Hanke (* 1965), cellist and arpeggione player
 Stephan Ebn (* 1978), drummer and music producer
 Thomas Paulus (* 1982), footballer
 Philipp Heerwagen (* 1983), football goalkeeper
 Daniel Brodmeier (* 1987), sportsman
 Dominik Schmid (* 1989), footballer
 Tim Pollmann (* 1990), footballer

References

External links

  
 Kelheim360.de  - Virtual 360° Panoramic Tour of old Town Kelheim

Kelheim (district)
Populated places on the Danube
Towns in Bavaria